USS Pontiac (AF-20) was the Danish refrigerated cargo ship Australian Reefer that sought refuge in the neutral United States when Germany occupied Denmark in April 1940. In 1941 the United States seized 40 Danish ships idle in its ports with Australian Reefer being among those ships.

The ship was turned over to the War Shipping Administration (WSA) on 12 July 1941 and put into operation with United States Lines as its agent. Australian Reefer operated under a United States Army Transportation Corps agreement until 11 May 1942 when the ship was transferred to the Navy under bareboat charter. After conversion and being renamed Pontiac the ship served as a refrigerator ship or reefer ship, and provided food to Allied forces in the North Atlantic Ocean.

Pontiac was heavily damaged on 30 January 1945 by  being holed by a paravane off Halifax, Nova Scotia causing the ship to sink. After being raised the ship was towed to Norfolk, Virginia and declared a total constructive loss on 13 April 1945. The actual title to the ship was requisitioned and the Danish owner paid compensation on 12 July 1945.

Service career
Australian Reefer, a refrigerator ship built as hull 79 by Nakskov Skibsværft A/C, Nakskov, Denmark was launched 6 February 1937. Australian Reefer was propelled by a 10 cylinder Burmeister & Wain diesel engine. The ship operated between Denmark, New York and South America until after the occupation of Denmark by German forces.

The Danish ship was one of forty Danish merchant vessels, totaling , seized by the United States Coast Guard under the authority of Public Law 101, 77th Congress and Executive Order 8771, 6 June 1941. Most of the Danish ships were delivered to the War Shipping Administration (WSA), registered in Panama for diplomatic reasons, and operated under new names by commercial companies as WSA agents.

Australian Reefer was delivered to the War Shipping Administration at New York 12 July 1941 for operation by its agent, United States Lines, under an Army Transportation Corps agreement between New York and Australia and New Zealand until 5 February 1942.

After voyage repairs she was transferred to the Navy on a bareboat charter basis on 11 May 1942 and commissioned as Pontiac (AF-20), 12 May 1942. Following conversion and shakedown, Pontiac, assigned to Service Force, Atlantic, departed Norfolk, Virginia, 15 June 1942 on her first Argentia run. On 15 July she completed that run at Boston, Massachusetts, whence she continued to carry supplies to the Maritime Provinces and Newfoundland through 1943. Between late January and May 1944 she conducted sugar runs between Norfolk and Trinidad, Guantánamo Bay and San Juan, then returned to Boston to resume runs to Argentia and, in June, to Iceland.

She completed a quick run to Bermuda in early August, then returned to the Boston-Argentia route before undertaking her last Caribbean run from New York 7 September. On 25 September she arrived at Norfolk from San Juan, made a trip to Bermuda and on 16 November returned to Boston to resume carrying stores to Nova Scotia and Newfoundland. For the next two months she alternated voyages to Argentia with runs to Bermuda and on 29 January 1945 departed Boston for her last run to Canada.

On 30 January 1945 in heavy seas off Halifax the ship's hull was damaged by a loose paravane. The tug , out of Halifax, took her in tow and subsequently beached the vessel on Maughers Beach, McNabs Island at coordinates . Raised on 17 February, she was towed to Halifax for temporary repairs.

The Navy's Bureau of Ships noted in a review that the cargo space lacked bulkheads with only a half-height one between number one and two cargo hatches and none aft between the engine room bulkhead and afterpeak. The near loss — and actual total constructive loss — of the ship due to damage from relatively small holes in the hull confirmed estimation that the ship would sink in event of any uncontrolled flooding either forward or aft.

On 14 March she arrived at Norfolk, where she decommissioned 20 May 1945. The Navy had removed deck machinery, stripped main and auxiliary engines of usable parts and removed items such as the laundry. To decrease draft and improve stability the topside areas had been stripped of movable items. Pontiac was returned to the Maritime Commission on the 21st and was struck from the Navy List 2 June 1945. For compensation, $1,374,255.86 were paid to her former Danish owner on 12 July 1945. The ship itself was sold for scrapping for $33,669.00 to the Patapsco Scrap Corporporation on 7 May 1945.

See also 
 USAT Sicilien

Footnotes

References

Bibliography

External links 

 Australian Reefer on ways showing stern.
 M/S Australian Reefer construction & operation photos.
 Launch photo with date of 6 February 1937.
 Photo of hold
 Interior, officer's mess
 M/S Australian Reefer at Esbjerg.
 NavSource Online: Service Ship Photo Archive - AF-20 Pontiac

1937 ships
Ships built in Denmark
Merchant ships of Denmark
Stores ships of the United States Navy
World War II auxiliary ships of the United States
Maritime incidents in January 1945